Mei Lin may refer to:

 Mei Lin (actress)
 Mei Lin (chef)

See also
 Meilin (disambiguation)